Lachhipur is a village in the Ghatal CD block in the Ghatal subdivision of the Paschim Medinipur district in the state of West Bengal, India.

Geography

Location

Area overview
Ishwar Chandra Vidyasagar, scholar, social reformer and a key figure of the Bengal Renaissance, was born at Birsingha on 26 September 1820.

Ghatal subdivision, shown in the map alongside, has alluvial soils. Around 85% of the total cultivated area is cropped more than once. It has a density of population of 1,099 per km2, but being a small subdivision only a little over a fifth of the people in the district reside in this subdivision. 14.33% of the population lives in urban areas and 86.67% lives in the rural areas.

Note: The map alongside presents some of the notable locations in the subdivision. All places marked in the map are linked in the larger full screen map.

Demographics
According to the 2011 Census of India, Lachhipur had a total population of 854, of which 450 (53%) were males and 404 (47%) were females.

Education
Lachhipur Binapani High School is a Bengali-medium coeducational institution established in 1952. The school has facilities for teaching from class V to class XII. It has a library with 2,500 books, 2 computers and a playground.

Culture
David J. McCutchion mention:
Sridhara temple as a nava-ratna with smooth rekha turrets, built in 1856, it measures 13’ 10” square, with large terracotta figures. 
Rasmancha of the Bag family as a saptadasa-ratna with baroque vase pinnacles, built in 1879, it measures 4’ 6” square, with large terracotta figures.

Lachhipur picture gallery

References

External links

Villages in Paschim Medinipur district